Brendan Roy Clouston (born 1953) is a Canadian billionaire, former CEO and president of the telecoms company, Tele-Communications Inc.

Early life
Clouston was born in Montreal, Quebec in 1953, the son of Ross Neal Clouston (1922–2008) and Brenda Clouston. His father cofounded, with his brother, George, LaSalle Frozen Foods and BlueWater Seafoods. The company was acquired by Gorton's of Gloucester, of which he later became president.

His brother Bob Clouston was president and CCO of Sargento Foods Inc, the Wisconsin cheese producer.

He received a bachelor's degree in philosophy from the University of Toronto in 1975, followed by an MBA from the Ivey Business School in London, Ontario in 1979.

Career
Clouston started his career as a management consultant in Toronto, before joining the Bank of Boston. He joined TCI in 1983 as director of finance, and in 1991 he became COO, reporting directly to John Malone. Clouston was CEO and president from 1994. Clouston retired from  TCI in 1998, before it was purchased by AT&T the following year.

In 2015, The Scotsman called him a "reclusive billionaire".

Personal life

Brendan is a longtime sailor, beginning with many singlehanded adventures in an around Norman's Woe, as a teenager. At 18, he spent a year on the school ship Antarna, where he made lifelong friends.

He and his wife Judy moved to the UK from Denver, Colorado some time before 2000. They lived at Chedington Court, Chedington, Dorset, England, having bought the former hotel in 1997 for £1.2 million. Clouston also purchased two coach houses and the former vicarage of the village in an attempt to recreate the original estate. Clouston also bought himself the title of Baron of Dunure, which was printed on his letterhead in 1998.

In 2003, he bought the  Eilean Aigas island estate in Scotland, and put it up for sale in 2012 with an asking price of £15 million. It sold in 2015 for £3 million. He now lives in the Channel Islands.

References

1953 births
Living people
Businesspeople from Montreal
University of Toronto alumni
Canadian billionaires
Canadian emigrants to England
Canadian emigrants to Scotland
University of Western Ontario alumni